Cetera Financial Group (commonly referred to as Cetera) is a shared service organization serving affiliates that comprise the second-largest family of independent broker-dealers in the United States. The company has nearly 8,000 financial advisors, is a leading provider of retail financial services to investment programs of banks and credit unions, and has over $224.5 billion in advisory and brokerage assets under advisement, generating approximately $1.6 billion in annual revenue  for the 2016 fiscal year. “Cetera Financial Group” refers to the network of independent retail firms encompassing, among others, Cetera Advisors, Cetera Advisor Networks, Cetera Investment Services (marketed as Cetera Financial Institutions), Cetera Financial Specialists, First Allied Securities,  and Summit Brokerage Services. All firms are members FINRA/SIPC.

Cetera has corporate offices in El Segundo, California., Boca Raton, Florida, Denver, Colorado, San Diego, California., San Jose, California, St. Cloud, Minnesota., and Schaumburg, Illinois.

History 
Cetera was established in February 2010 when ING Group sold three broker-dealers, Financial Network Investment Corp., Multi-Financial Securities Corp. and PrimeVest Financial Services Inc., to an investment fund managed by Lightyear Capital LLC, a private equity firm specializing in financial services. The firms kept their names, but operated under the new group name Cetera Financial Group. In April 2012 the group purchased Genworth Financial’s broker-dealer and investment adviser firms, Genworth Financial Securities Corp. and Genworth Financial Advisors Corp.

On September 4, 2012, Cetera rebranded each of the firms; Financial Network was renamed Cetera Advisor Networks, Multi-Financial became Cetera Advisors, and PrimeVest became Cetera Investment Services (marketed as Cetera Financial Institutions). The Genworth firms became Cetera Financial Specialists, the broker-dealer, and Cetera Investment Advisers, the registered investment adviser.

RCS Capital Corporation purchased Cetera on April 29, 2014, along with other independent broker-dealer and investment advisors  including: First Allied on September 25, 2013.; Investors Capital Holdings Ltd.  and Summit Brokerage on June 11, 2014 ; JP Turner on June 13, 2014, Girard Securities on March 18, 2015, and VSR Group  on May 12, 2015.

On May 25, 2016, Cetera completed a transformation into an independent, privately held organization under parent company, Aretec Group, Inc.  Through this restructuring process, a new board of directors was established.

On May 11, 2016, Cetera announced the launch of its advisory platform, My Advice Architect, the first segment of the firm’s Advice Architect Ecosystem.

In early 2017, Cetera implemented The Advice-Centric Experience, a new strategic blueprint for redefining the delivery of retail financial advice for individuals and families seeking financial well-being. 

In July 2018, Genstar Capital announced the intention to acquire the majority interest in the Cetera Financial Group. The transaction was completed in October 2018.

Awards

 WealthManagement.com Industry Awards (2017)
 Finalist: Practice Management for Broker-Dealers with 1,000+ Advisors
 Finalist: Technology for Broker-Dealers with 1,000+ Advisors
 BISA Technology Awards (2017)
 Won two Bank Insurance & Securities Association Technology Innovation Awards for DOL DynamIQs and Cetera Fastpath programs

Legal

In December 2020, Cetera Advisor Networks, Cetera Advisors, and Cetera Financial Specialists agreed to pay the Financial Industry Regulatory Authority (FINRA) a $1 million fine following allegations that the firms had failed to supervise their dually registered representatives.

References

External links
Cetera web site
Cetera Advisors web site
Cetera Advisor Networks web site
Cetera Financial Institutions web site
Cetera Financial Specialists web site
First Allied web site
Girard Securities web site
Summit Brokerage Services web site
Cetera Retirement Plan Specialists web site

Financial services companies established in 2010
Investment management companies of the United States
Financial services companies of the United States
Privately held companies based in California
2010 establishments in California